Ivo Ardais Wortmann (born 10 March 1949) is a Brazilian former professional football player and manager. 

Ivo Wortmann was a defensive midfielder as a player. He played for América-RJ and for Palmeiras. He coached Saudi Arabia under-16 national team to winning the title in the 1989 FIFA U-16 World Championship.

Honours

Manager

Club
Saudi Arabia
FIFA U-16 World Championship: 1989

External links
 
 
 Ivo Wortmann coach profile at O Gol

1949 births
Living people
Brazilian people of German descent
Brazilian footballers
1975 Copa América players
Brazilian football managers
Expatriate football managers in Qatar
Expatriate football managers in Russia
Expatriate football managers in Saudi Arabia
Campeonato Brasileiro Série A managers
Russian Premier League managers
Campeonato Brasileiro Série B managers
Grêmio Foot-Ball Porto Alegrense managers
America Football Club (RJ) players
Sociedade Esportiva Palmeiras players
Al Ahli SC (Doha) managers
Grêmio Esportivo Brasil managers 
Sociedade Esportiva e Recreativa Caxias do Sul managers
America Football Club (RJ) managers
Criciúma Esporte Clube managers
Qatar national football team managers
Al Shabab FC (Riyadh) managers
Botafogo de Futebol e Regatas managers
Coritiba Foot Ball Club managers
Cruzeiro Esporte Clube managers 
Sport Club Internacional managers 
Paysandu Sport Club managers 
Goiás Esporte Clube managers
Esporte Clube Juventude managers  
FC Dynamo Moscow managers
Fluminense FC managers
Al-Wehda Club (Mecca) managers
Brasiliense Futebol Clube managers
Miami Fusion coaches
Association football midfielders
Guangzhou F.C. non-playing staff
Brazilian expatriate football managers
Brazilian expatriate sportspeople in Qatar
Brazilian expatriate sportspeople in Russia
Brazilian expatriate sportspeople in Saudi Arabia
Brazilian expatriate sportspeople in the United States
Expatriate soccer managers in the United States
Major League Soccer coaches